Michael Pettis (born June 16, 1958) is a professor of finance at Guanghua School of Management at Peking University in Beijing. He was founder and co-owner of punk-rock nightclub D22 in Beijing, which closed in January 2012.

Pettis is a speaker and writer on global economic growth, having published two books on the subject. In 2013, Princeton University Press published his second book, The Great Rebalancing: Trade, Conflict, and the Perilous Road Ahead for the World Economy.

Biography

Early life and education 
Pettis was born in Zaragoza, Spain to a French mother and an American father. His father was a geologist and civil engineer. He spent his childhood in Peru, Pakistan, Morocco and Haiti, before returning to Spain for High School. Pettis entered Columbia University in 1976.   He received a Masters of International Affairs (emphasis in Economic Development) in 1981 and a Masters of Business Administration in Finance in 1984, both from Columbia University.

Career 
Michael began his career in 1987, joining Manufacturers Hanover (now JPMorgan Chase) as a trader in the Sovereign Debt group. From 1996 to 2001, he was at Bear Stearns as a managing director-principal in Latin American capital markets. Pettis also served as an advisor to sovereign governments on topics regarding financial management; including the governments of Mexico, North Macedonia and South Korea.

Pettis is a frequent guest as an economic expert, with media appearances on news stations including CNBC, NPR, Bloomberg Radio and BBC.

Projects 
In April 2006, Pettis opened D22, a nightclub he founded and co-owned. In 2007, he founded the label Maybe Mars around the club. D22 closed January 2012; the reasons for closure included the venue no longer being suitable for some events and high forthcoming maintenance costs. Pettis's intention was to open another club.

Writings

Chinese economic investment 
Pettis has long warned that heavy investment by China into infrastructure projects, at the expense of consumption, is cause for serious concern. The banking sector in particular, the source of cheap loans for large infrastructure projects, has accumulated large debts both on and off balance sheet. There are only two methods by which investment, which is estimated at almost 50% of China's GDP, would decline to a level more consistent with other Asian economies. China can either deliberately de-incentivize investment spending, at the near-term cost of slowing economic growth, or investment can continue to rise as a share of GDP until the financial system cannot absorb further increases to debt, and a financial contraction will ensue.

Publications 
 The Volatility Machine: Emerging Economics and the Threat of Financial Collapse, Oxford: Oxford University Press, May 2001.
 The Great Rebalancing: Trade, Conflict, and the Perilous Road Ahead for the World Economy, Princeton: Princeton University Press, January 2013.
 Avoiding the Fall: China's Economic Restructuring, Washington: Carnegie Endowment for International Peace, September 2013.
 Trade Wars Are Class Wars: How Rising Inequality Distorts the Global Economy and Threatens International Peace with Matthew C. Klein, New Haven: Yale University Press, May 2020.

References

External links 
 Michael Pettis own website, China Financial Markets, now hosted at Carnegie
 Michael Pettis speech from August 2011, "How Long Can China Grow?"
 Economist magazine bets professor over China's future
 Review of The Great Rebalancing

Living people
21st-century American economists
Academic staff of Peking University
People from Zaragoza
Columbia Business School alumni
School of International and Public Affairs, Columbia University alumni
1958 births